Léon Caurla, born Léa Caurla, (4 September 1926 – 2 March 2002) was a French athlete in the 100m and 200m events. He was notably 3rd in the Oslo European Championship in 1946 for the 200m.

He is especially known for being a trans man. He eventually  chose to be called Léon, got married and became a father.

Léon's main opponent, Pierre Brésolles, with whom he won several tournaments, proved also to be a trans man.

Together they ran a French 4 × 100 m relay record (with Anne-Marie Colchen and Monique Drilhon).

Prize list

See as well  
 Gender test

References

External links  
 Léo
 Léon

1926 births
2002 deaths
French male sprinters
Transgender men
Transgender sportsmen
French transgender people
French LGBT sportspeople
LGBT track and field athletes
20th-century French LGBT people